The Asia-Oceania Top University League on Engineering (abbreviated AOTULE, pronounced "our tool") is a league consisting of 13 engineering faculties within Asia and Oceania universities. AOTULE's mission is to improve the quality of its member's educational programs and promote research activity among members primarily through exchange of information between deans, faculty members and administration staff at its annual meeting. It also organizes graduate student exchange programs and conferences where graduate students present their latest research results in an interdisciplinary format.

History 

The seeds for forming AOTULE began in 2006 with discussions between senior engineering faculty at Tokyo Institute of Technology and Monash University. to promote graduate engineering student mobility within Asia and Oceania universities similar to the ERASMUS+ program offered by EU universities that is funded by the European commission. AOTULE was subsequently founded in 2007 at the Tokyo Institute of Technology, by holding its inaugural meeting where participating Engineering Deans signed a memorandum of understanding. Each Fall since 2007, an AOTULE member has organized and hosted the annual AOTULE student conference, administration staff and Dean's meeting as noted below.

Deans' Meeting, Administrative Staff Meeting and Student Conference 

The annual Deans', administrative staff meeting and student conference is held annually in October or November. Attendance at the annual conference varies between 130 - 180 participants. The Deans' meeting brings together Deans for discussions on topical educational programs related to the annual Deans meeting theme as well as joint educational programs, degree programs, accreditation, collaborations with industry and study-abroad programming. At the administration staff meeting, staff discuss issues related to administering student exchanges and share best practices. The student conference provides students an international forum to discuss their research with a multidisciplinary student audience. The 2013 AOTULE meeting and conference was held at Chulalongkorn in October 17–19, 2013, which coincided with the 100th anniversary of Chulalongkorn university. The 2016 AOTULE annual meeting and conference will be held at the Hong Kong University of Science and Technology (HKUST) in Hong Kong on Nov. 23-25, 2016. The 2017 AOTULE Deans meeting and conferences was held on Nov. 23-24, 2017 at the Hanoi University of Science and Technology (HUST) in Hanoi, Vietnam. The 2018 AOTULE Deans meeting and conferences was held on Nov. 23-24, 2018 at the Indian Institute of Technology, Madras (IITM) in Madras, India. The 2019 AOTULE Deans meeting and conferences was held on Nov. 25-27, 2017 at the Tokyo Institute of Technology, Tokyo, Japan

Student Research Exchanges and Overseas Visits 

To promote student mobility, AOTULE members organize intra-AOTULE student short stays and research exchanges varying in length from one week at Chulalongkorn University to three months at Tokyo Institute of Technology. These exchanges facilitate global engineering, cross-cultural competencies, foreign language learning, and research experiences by students since the majority of AOTULE members' students live in countries where English is not the native language.  AOTULE members such as Tokyo Tech's School of Engineering have used AOTULE as a test bed for creating new research exchange programs that are later broaden to university-wide programs with research university partners in the USA and EU. Recently, there has been growing numbers of double degree graduate programs signed between AOTULE member institutions to allow participating graduate students to obtain two degrees by completing graduation requirements at two institutions. This allows double degree participants an opportunity to learn more about the host country where they are studying, undertake a research project in greater depth and establish a greater network of peers than that provided by a short term exchanges.

Members

Notes 
 At Bandung Institute of Technology participants are the School of Electrical Engineering and Informatics, Faculty of Mechanical and Aerospace Engineering, Faculty of Industrial Technology, Faculty of Mining and Petroleum Engineering, and Faculty of Civil and Environmental Engineering. 
 At Hanoi University of Science and Technology there are 16 schools which are eligible to participate in AOTULE activities.
 At Tokyo Institute of Technology there are 3 schools of engineering that participate in AOTULE activities.

References

External links 
AOTULE * 

Engineering university associations and consortia
International scientific organizations